A premier ensemble is a certain class of military band in the United States armed forces that exist to promote the U.S. military to the public at large, to support state ceremonies, and to preserve the heritage of American martial music. They are configured and commanded so as to attract the highest-quality musicians available, and competition for enlistment is typically fierce.  there are eleven such units.

Description

Organization and personnel
Five of the six branches of the U.S. armed forces designates one or more of its military bands as premier ensembles, although the exact terminology used to describe such units varies (the U.S. Army uses the term "Special Bands"). While branch-wide, as opposed to unit-specific, bands have existed since the formation of the U.S. Marine Band in the 1790s, the idea of forming superior music ensembles posted in the vicinity of Washington, D.C. originated with John Pershing in the early 1920s and formalized with the transition of the U.S. Navy School of Music from a training program for naval bandsmen to a multi-service institute responsible for Navy, Marine Corps, and Army premier musicians in 1951.

With the exception of the United States Marine Drum and Bugle Corps, new enlistees in premier ensembles automatically enter at the pay grade of E6 (staff sergeant in the Army and Marine Corps, Technical Sergeant in the Air Force, and Petty Officer First Class in the Navy and Coast Guard) and enjoy enlistment contracts that guarantee they are not deployable outside the United States, meaning competition for billets is fierce. These organizations have typically attracted the highest-caliber musicians available, selected through a competitive audition process.

In the past, some premier ensembles have been administered separately from the rest of their branch's bands; they generally do not have any duties other than musical performance. During wartime, by contrast, non-premier U.S. Marine Corps and U.S. Army bands reconfigure into light infantry units responsible for rear-area defense and EPW (enemy prisoner-of-war) security. Personnel of the U.S. Marine Band forgo recruit training altogether; instead, after enlistment under a four-year contract, they are directly assigned to their duty station at the Marine Barracks in Washington, where they receive on-the-job training to provide them with the necessary military skills required to perform their role.

Role
Premier ensembles are tasked with promoting the image of the U.S. armed forces through public performances, concerts, and parades. They also support official government ceremonies such as state visits, are used as recording groups to produce the music used in recruiting advertisements and other productions of the armed forces, and provide ceremonial support to the corps of cadets and midshipmen at the U.S. Military Academy (West Point), U.S. Naval Academy (Annapolis), U.S. Air Force Academy, and U.S. Coast Guard Academy.

Bands currently designated as premier ensembles
Of the military's 137 regular and reserve bands, 11 are currently designated premier ensembles, including four U.S. Army bands, two U.S. Marine Corps bands. two U.S. Navy bands, two U.S. Air Force bands, and one U.S. Coast Guard band. Of the eleven premier ensembles, the U.S. Marine Band is the oldest, having been activated in 1798.

References

Brass bands
Premier ensembles
Wind bands
Premier ensembles
American military bands